Harpalus salinus klementzae is a subspecies of ground beetle native to Central Asia, where it could be found in such countries as Mongolia,  Chinese province of Xinjiang, and Russian autonomous regions  such as Buryat Republic, Chita, Irkutsk, and Maritime Province.

References

salinus klementzae
Beetles of Asia
Beetles described in 1984